Tapeshwari  is a village development committee in Udayapur District in Province No. 1 of south-eastern Nepal. At the time of the 1991 Nepal census it had a population of 97045.

References

External links
UN map of the municipalities of Udayapur District

Populated places in Udayapur District
Belaka